Cavanillesia hylogeiton, also known as Ceiba Barrigona, is a species of trees in the family Malvaceae. It is native to Colombia.

References

Bombacoideae
Trees of Colombia